Those Wonderful Movie Cranks is a 1978 Czech comedy film directed by Jiří Menzel. The film was selected as the Czech entry for the Best Foreign Language Film at the 52nd Academy Awards, but was not accepted as a nominee.

The film has also been referred to by the title Magicians of the Silver Screen.

Cast
 Rudolf Hrušínský - Pasparte
 Vladimír Menšík - Slapeta
 Jiří Menzel - Kolenatý
 Vlasta Fabianová - Emílie Kolárová-Mladá
 Blažena Holišová - Evzenie
 Jaromíra Mílová - Pepicka
 Josef Kemr - Benjamín
 Oldřich Vlček - Berousek
 Josef Somr - Ourada
 Vladimír Huber - Hynek
 Marie Rosulková - Madame
 Hana Buresová - Aloisie

See also
 List of submissions to the 52nd Academy Awards for Best Foreign Language Film
 List of Czechoslovak submissions for the Academy Award for Best Foreign Language Film

References

External links
 

1978 films
Czechoslovak comedy films
1970s historical comedy films
Films directed by Jiří Menzel
Czech historical comedy films
1979 comedy films
1979 films
1978 comedy films
1970s Czech-language films
1970s Czech films